Álvaro José Domínguez Cabezas (born June 10, 1981 in Colombia) is a  former Colombian footballer.

Career

Club
Álvaro Domínguez, a native of the town of El Cerrito from the center of Valle del Cauca, began his career with Deportivo Cali in 2000. In 2002, he played on loan with Deportivo Pasto and with Atlético Huila. Upon returning to Cali, Domínguez became an important player for his team. In 2005, he helped Cali to capture the Finalización title. In 2007, he joined Swiss side FC Sion, where he was recognized for his sacrifice, long-distance shots and vision of the game. While with Sion he made 122 league appearances and scored 21 goals. During this period Domínguez was a key player in helping Sion to two Swiss Cup titles. In 2011, he left Sion and joined Turkish club Samsunspor on loan. At the end of the season he returned to his native Colombia signing with his first club Deportivo Cali.

International
He played for Colombia at the 2007 Copa America against Paraguay, as well as in friendlies before the tournament.

Honours 
Sion
Swiss Cup: 2010–11

References

External links

Player Profile FC Sion-Online

1981 births
Living people
Sportspeople from Valle del Cauca Department
Colombian footballers
Colombian expatriate footballers
Colombia international footballers
2007 Copa América players
Deportivo Cali footballers
Deportivo Pasto footballers
Atlético Huila footballers
Estudiantes de Mérida players
FC Sion players
Samsunspor footballers
Categoría Primera A players
Swiss Super League players
Süper Lig players
Expatriate footballers in Switzerland
Expatriate footballers in Turkey
Colombian expatriate sportspeople in Turkey
Colombian expatriate sportspeople in Switzerland
Association football midfielders